Demetria Dyan McKinney (born August 27, 1979) is an American actress and singer. From 2006 to 2012, during its original run, she starred in the TBS sitcom Tyler Perry's House of Payne, a BET revival of the show was announced in 2020. Her other series regular roles include TV One sitcom The Rickey Smiley Show, Bounce TV prime time soap opera Saints & Sinners and Syfy horror drama Superstition, as well as Motherland: Fort Salem on Freeform.

Her stage credits include playing Coretta Scott King in the Rhythm and Blues Opera I Dream (2010), as well as the role of Deena Jones in Dreamgirls (2012). In 2017, McKinney played Whitney Houston in the TV One film Bobbi Kristina. She released her debut album Officially Yours in 2017.

Career

Acting
McKinney has performed in a number of Tyler Perry's stage plays, including Meet The Browns, Why Did I Get Married and Madea's Family Christmas. She starred as Janine Shelton-Payne on the TBS comedy series Tyler Perry's House of Payne from 2006 to 2012. She was nominated for a 2009 National Association for Multi-ethnicity in Communications (NAMIC) Vision Award for Best Performance in a Comedy, in recognition of her work on House of Payne. She returned for the House of Payne spin-off The Paynes in 2018. McKinney has guest starred on Necessary Roughness, Drop Dead Diva, Devious Maids, Chicago Med, and Being Mary Jane. She also appeared on Bravo's The Real Housewives of Atlanta, as a recurring cast member during the seventh season, and a guest star on the eighth season. 

From 2012 to 2014, McKinney had a series regular role on the TV One comedy series, The Rickey Smiley Show. In 2016, she was cast as Tamara Austin in the Bounce TV prime time television soap opera Saints & Sinners. In 2017, she was cast opposite Mario Van Peebles and Robinne Lee in the Syfy horror drama Superstition. The series was canceled after one season. Also in 2017, McKinney starred in the TV One movie Bobbi Kristina as Whitney Houston, the late icon and mother to Bobbi Kristina.

McKinney had a recurring role in the BET drama series The Quad from 2017 to 2018. She also played a leading role in the 2018 Christmas themed romantic film A Stone Cold Christmas. In 2019, she starred in the Urban Movie Channel family drama series A House Divided alongside Paula Jai Parker. She was later cast in the Freeform drama series Motherland: Fort Salem. In 2022, she began starring on The Winchesters.

Singing
McKinney has performed in a number of musicals. In 2010, she performed in the Rhythm and Blues opera I Dream. She appeared in Dreamgirls and performed with Jennifer Holliday in 2012, and lent vocals to R&B singer Anthony David's album Love Out Loud. In 2015, her single "Trade It All" charted on Billboard'''s Adult R&B Songs.

In 2017, McKinney released her debut album Officially Yours''. She received a nomination for the NAACP Image Award for Outstanding New Artist. From this album, she released three singles: "Is This Love", "Happy" and "Easy" which peaked at #4 on the Adult R&B Songs chart.

Personal life 
McKinney faced homelessness at the age of 17 and has one child.

She was in a decade long on-off relationship with TV producer Roger Bobb. McKinney called off their engagement in 2016, then later on announced she was dating music producer Eric Philips.

Filmography

Film

Television

Discography

Studio albums

Singles

References

External links 

 

African-American actresses
Living people
1979 births
Filipino emigrants to the United States
American actresses of Filipino descent
African-American female models
Female models from New Mexico
African-American models
20th-century African-American women singers
Actresses from Albuquerque, New Mexico
21st-century American singers
21st-century American women singers
21st-century African-American women singers